Sophia Vossou (born 5 December 1961) is a Greek singer best known abroad for representing Greece at the Eurovision Song Contest 1991 where she was placed 13th with the song "I Anixi".

Biography
Vossou was born in 1961 in Patras. She grew up in Athens where she studied music. In 1984 she took part in the Thessaloniki Song Contest where she won first prize. Following her success, Vossou began singing in nightclubs and soon released her first record Sophia, a pop and rock album. From the mid-1990s she started singing folk music with minor success. Her album, San Alitissa (Like A Tramp), was released in 2002, but was not a commercial success. She then cooperated with a group formed by Orthodox Christian monks, recording two pop/rock/gospel music with them.

Radio and television
Apart from her musical career, Vossou produced popular shows for the radio and television. She was the hostess of a very popular morning show on Mega Channel and continued her television career with another morning show on another Greek channel, while in 2006 she was one of the teachers in Dream Show, a talent show on Alpha Channel. She continued to work for Alpha by co-hosting a morning TV show with her former partner Andreas Mikroutsikos and his current wife. Apart from that she appeared on stage as a crazy maid, along with her comedian friend Elda Panopoulou. Vossou also had a supporting role on the sitcom Ola stin Taratsa for Alpha. In 2014, she participated in the show Your Face Sounds Familiar 2 broadcast by ANT1.

Eurovision Song Contest 1991
In 1991, Vossou and Andreas Mikroutsikos were chosen to represent Greece at the Eurovision Song Contest in Rome with the song "I Anixi" (Spring). The song was successful in Greece, certifying platinum. "I Anixi" scored 36 points and ranked 13th among 22 at the Eurovision final in Rome.

Discography

Personal Discography

Compilations
Christougenna me ta asteria (Christmas with the Stars)
SOS
Konta sas (Close to you)
Eurosongs
Tihi Vouno (Crazy Luck)/OST
Na maste pali edo Adrea (Here we are again Adrea)
Join the club
Villa Mercedes

References
 
 
 

1961 births
20th-century Greek women singers
Eurovision Song Contest entrants for Greece
Eurovision Song Contest entrants of 1991
Musicians from Patras
Living people
Thessaloniki Song Festival entrants
Singers from Athens
21st-century Greek women singers